The 2019–20 Vijay Hazare Trophy is the 18th season of the Vijay Hazare Trophy, a List A cricket tournament in India. It is being contested by 38 teams, divided into four groups, with nine teams in Group A. The group stage started on 24 September 2019. The top five teams across Group A and Group B progressed to the quarter-finals of the competition.

Seventeen out of the first thirty matches that were scheduled to be played across all four groups were abandoned or finished in a no result. Therefore, the Board of Control for Cricket in India (BCCI) issued a revised schedule for the rain-affected matches. Group A is now scheduled to finish on 16 October 2019, three days later than originally planned.

On 12 October 2019, in the match between Kerala and Goa, Kerala's Sanju Samson scored the fastest double century in List A cricket. It was the highest individual total in the Vijay Hazare Trophy, with an unbeaten 212 runs from 129 balls. It was also the highest total made by a wicket-keeper in a List A cricket match. The partnership between him and Sachin Baby was the highest List A partnership for the third wicket. It was also the fourth-highest List A partnership in the history of the game and highest in India. On 16 October 2019, Yashasvi Jaiswal became the youngest player to score a double century in List A cricket.

After the final group matches, Chhattisgarh, Karnataka and Mumbai had all progressed from Group A to the knockout phase of the tournament.

Points table

Fixtures

Round 1

Round 2

Round 3

Round 4

Round 5

Round 6

Round 7

Round 8

Round 9

Round 10

Round 11

Round 12

Round 13

References

Vijay Hazare Trophy
Vijay Hazare Trophy
Vijay Hazare Trophy